The 2021–22 Bellarmine Knights men's basketball team represented Bellarmine University in the 2021–22 NCAA Division I men's basketball season. The Knights, led by 17th-year head coach Scott Davenport, played their home games at Freedom Hall in Louisville, Kentucky as members West division of the ASUN Conference. They finished the season 20–13, 11–5 in ASUN play to finish in second place in the West division. They defeated Florida Gulf Coast, Liberty, and Jacksonville to win the ASUN tournament championship. Because the Knights were in the second year of a four-year transition period from Division II to Division I, they were not eligible for NCAA postseason play. As a result, the conference's automatic bid to the NCAA tournament went to regular season champion Jacksonville State.

Previous season
In a season limited due to the ongoing COVID-19 pandemic, the Knights finished the 2020–21 season 14–8, 10–3 in ASUN play to finish in second place. The season marked Bellarmine's first year of a four-year transition period from Division II to Division I. They lost in the first round of the ASUN tournament to Stetson. They received an invitation to the College Basketball Invitational tournament where they defeated Army in the quarterfinals before losing in the semifinals to Pepperdine.

Roster

Schedule and results

|-
!colspan=12 style=| Exhibition

|-
!colspan=13 style=| Non-conference regular season

|-
!colspan=13 style=| ASUN Conference regular season

|-
!colspan=12 style=| ASUN tournament

Source

References

Bellarmine Knights men's basketball seasons
Bellarmine
Bellarmine Knights men's basketball
Bellarmine Knights men's basketball